The 2021–22 Big Bash League season is the eleventh season of the Big Bash League, the premier Twenty20 cricket competition in Australia. Each 2021–22 squad is made up of 18 active players. Teams can sign up to five overseas players, with a maximum of three of those being able to play in a matchday.

Adelaide Strikers

Brisbane Heat

Hobart Hurricanes

Melbourne Renegades

Melbourne Stars

Perth Scorchers

Sydney Sixers

Sydney Thunder

References

Big Bash League cricketers
Big Bash League lists